Ryan Seaton (born 3 December 1987 in Belfast, Northern Ireland) is an Irish sailor. He represented Ireland at the 2012 Summer Olympics in the 49er class alongside Matt McGovern, the pair finished 14th. He also competed at the 2016 Summer Olympics where he and Matt McGowan finished 10th .

References

1987 births
Living people
Irish male sailors (sport)
Olympic sailors of Ireland
Sailors at the 2012 Summer Olympics – 49er
Sailors at the 2016 Summer Olympics – 49er
Sportspeople from Belfast